Philip or Phil White may refer to:

 Phil White (American football) (1900–1982), American football halfback
 Phil White (politician) (1938–2000), Australian politician
 Phil R. White (born 1963), Canadian artist and sculptor
 Philip White (Canadian politician) (1923–2013), mayor of York, Ontario, 1970–1978
 Philip Bruce White (1891–1949), British microbiologist
 Philip Jacob White (1863–1929), British physician and zoologist
 Philip L. White (1923–2009), American historian and civic activist
 Phil White (footballer) (1930–2000), English football winger
 Philip Rodney White (1901–1968), American agricultural scientist
 Philip White (composer), spanish composer